Smith's Island is part of the chain which makes up Bermuda. It is located in St. George's Parish, in the northeast of the territory.

The 61 acre (24.5 hectare) island is located close to the northern entrance to St. George's Harbour, east of the town of St. George's to the south of the slightly smaller Paget Island and close to the coast of the much larger St. David's Island.

The island is of historical significance, as it is the site of the first settlement in Bermuda, when Carter, Chard and Waters built cabins here in 1610, who remained behind after the other survivors of the 1609 wreck of the Sea Venture sailed for Jamestown, Virginia. This was two years before the first planned colonists arrived on 11 July 1612. 

Islands of Bermuda
St. George's Parish, Bermuda